was a railway station on the Iwaizumi Line in Miyako, Japan, operated by East Japan Railway Company (JR East).

Lines
Iwate-Wainai Station was a station on the Iwaizumi Line, and was located 10.0 rail kilometers from the opposing terminus of the line at Moichi Station.

Station layout
Iwate-Wainai Station had a single side platform serving traffic in both directions. The original station building was demolished in December 2004 and replaced by a simple waiting room. The station was unattended.

History
Iwate-Wainai Station opened on 25 June 1942. The station was absorbed into the JR East network upon the privatization of the Japanese National Railways (JNR) on 1 April 1987.  The operation of the Iwaizumi Line was suspended from July 2010 and the line was officially closed on 1 April 2014.

Surrounding area
Wainai Post Office
Japan National Route 340

References

Railway stations in Japan opened in 1942
Railway stations in Iwate Prefecture
Iwaizumi Line
Defunct railway stations in Japan
Railway stations closed in 2014
2014 disestablishments in Japan